Netti may refer to

The Nettipakarana,  a Buddhist scripture
Aeschynomene aspera, a species of flowering plant in the family Fabaceae
Netti (name)

See also

Neti (disambiguation)
Netta (disambiguation)
Netto (disambiguation)
Nettie (disambiguation)
Netty (disambiguation)
Nitti (disambiguation)
Notti (disambiguation)